Mimesis (mīmēsis) is a term used in literary criticism and philosophy that carries a wide range of meanings, including imitatio, imitation, nonsensuous similarity, receptivity, representation, mimicry, the act of expression, the act of resembling, and the presentation of the self.

The original Ancient Greek term mīmēsis derives from mīmeisthai ('to imitate'), itself coming from mimos (μῖμος, 'imitator, actor'). In ancient Greece, mīmēsis was an idea that governed the creation of works of art, in particular, with correspondence to the physical world understood as a model for beauty, truth, and the good. Plato contrasted mimesis, or imitation, with diegesis, or narrative. After Plato, the meaning of mimesis eventually shifted toward a specifically literary function in ancient Greek society.

One of the best-known modern studies of mimesis—understood in literature as a form of realism—is Erich Auerbach's Mimesis: The Representation of Reality in Western Literature, which opens with a  comparison between the way the world is represented in Homer's Odyssey and the way it appears in the Bible.

In addition to Plato and Auerbach, mimesis has been theorised by thinkers as diverse as Aristotle, Philip Sidney, Samuel Taylor Coleridge, Adam Smith, Gabriel Tarde, Sigmund Freud, Walter Benjamin, Theodor Adorno, Paul Ricœur, Luce Irigaray, Jacques Derrida, René Girard, Nikolas Kompridis, Philippe Lacoue-Labarthe, Michael Taussig, Merlin Donald, Homi Bhabha, Roberto Calasso, and Nidesh Lawtoo. During the nineteenth century, the racial politics of imitation towards African Americans influenced the term mimesis and its evolution.-->

Classical definitions

Plato
Both Plato and Aristotle saw in mimesis the representation of nature, including human nature, as reflected in the dramas of the period. Plato wrote about mimesis in both Ion and The Republic (Books II, III, and X). In Ion, he states that poetry is the art of divine madness, or inspiration. Because the poet is subject to this divine madness, instead of possessing 'art' or 'knowledge' (techne) of the subject, the poet does not speak truth (as characterized by Plato's account of the Forms). As Plato has it, truth is the concern of the philosopher. As culture in those days did not consist in the solitary reading of books, but in the listening to performances, the recitals of orators (and poets), or the acting out by classical actors of tragedy, Plato maintained in his critique that theatre was not sufficient in conveying the truth. He was concerned that actors or orators were thus able to persuade an audience by rhetoric rather than by telling the truth.

In Book II of The Republic, Plato describes Socrates' dialogue with his pupils. Socrates warns we should not seriously regard poetry as being capable of attaining the truth and that we who listen to poetry should be on our guard against its seductions, since the poet has no place in our idea of God.

Developing upon this in Book X, Plato told of Socrates' metaphor of the three beds: one bed exists as an idea made by God (the Platonic ideal, or form); one is made by the carpenter, in imitation of God's idea; and one is made by the artist in imitation of the carpenter's.

So the artist's bed is twice removed from the truth. Those who copy only touch on a small part of things as they really are, where a bed may appear differently from various points of view, looked at obliquely or directly, or differently again in a mirror. So painters or poets, though they may paint or describe a carpenter, or any other maker of things, know nothing of the carpenter's (the craftsman's) art, and though the better painters or poets they are, the more faithfully their works of art will resemble the reality of the carpenter making a bed, nonetheless the imitators will still not attain the truth (of God's creation).

The poets, beginning with Homer, far from improving and educating humanity, do not possess the knowledge of craftsmen and are mere imitators who copy again and again images of virtue and rhapsodise about them, but never reach the truth in the way the superior philosophers do.

Aristotle
Similar to Plato's writings about mimesis, Aristotle also defined mimesis as the perfection, and imitation of nature. Art is not only imitation but also the use of mathematical ideas and symmetry in the search for the perfect, the timeless, and contrasting being with becoming. Nature is full of change, decay, and cycles, but art can also search for what is everlasting and the first causes of natural phenomena. Aristotle wrote about the idea of four causes in nature. The first, the formal cause, is like a blueprint, or an immortal idea. The second cause is the material cause, or what a thing is made out of. The third cause is the efficient cause, that is, the process and the agent by which the thing is made. The fourth, the final cause, is the good, or the purpose and end of a thing, known as telos.

Aristotle's Poetics is often referred to as the counterpart to this Platonic conception of poetry. Poetics is his treatise on the subject of mimesis. Aristotle was not against literature as such; he stated that human beings are mimetic beings, feeling an urge to create texts (art) that reflect and represent reality.

Aristotle considered it important that there be a certain distance between the work of art on the one hand and life on the other; we draw knowledge and consolation from tragedies only because they do not happen to us. Without this distance, tragedy could not give rise to catharsis. However, it is equally important that the text causes the audience to identify with the characters and the events in the text, and unless this identification occurs, it does not touch us as an audience. Aristotle holds that it is through "simulated representation," mimesis, that we respond to the acting on the stage, which is conveying to us what the characters feel, so that we may empathise with them in this way through the mimetic form of dramatic roleplay. It is the task of the dramatist to produce the tragic enactment to accomplish this empathy by means of what is taking place on stage.

In short, catharsis can be achieved only if we see something that is both recognisable and distant. Aristotle argued that literature is more interesting as a means of learning than history, because history deals with specific facts that have happened, and which are contingent, whereas literature, although sometimes based on history, deals with events that could have taken place or ought to have taken place.

Aristotle thought of drama as being "an imitation of an action" and of tragedy as "falling from a higher to a lower estate" and so being removed to a less ideal situation in more tragic circumstances than before. He posited the characters in tragedy as being better than the average human being, and those of comedy as being worse.

Michael Davis, a translator and commentator of Aristotle writes:

Contrast to diegesis
It was also Plato and Aristotle who contrasted mimesis with diegesis (Greek: διήγησις). Mimesis shows, rather than tells, by means of directly represented action that is enacted. Diegesis, however, is the telling of the story by a narrator; the author narrates action indirectly and describes what is in the characters' minds and emotions. The narrator may speak as a particular character or may be the "invisible narrator" or even the "all-knowing narrator" who speaks from above in the form of commenting on the action or the characters.

In Book III of his Republic (c. 373 BC), Plato examines the style of poetry (the term includes comedy, tragedy, epic and lyric poetry): all types narrate events, he argues, but by differing means. He distinguishes between narration or report (diegesis) and imitation or representation (mimesis). Tragedy and comedy, he goes on to explain, are wholly imitative types; the dithyramb is wholly narrative; and their combination is found in epic poetry. When reporting or narrating, "the poet is speaking in his own person; he never leads us to suppose that he is anyone else;" when imitating, the poet produces an "assimilation of himself to another, either by the use of voice or gesture." In dramatic texts, the poet never speaks directly; in narrative texts, the poet speaks as himself or herself.

In his Poetics, Aristotle argues that kinds of poetry (the term includes drama, flute music, and lyre music for Aristotle) may be differentiated in three ways: according to their medium, according to their objects, and according to their mode or manner (section I); "For the medium being the same, and the objects the same, the poet may imitate by narration—in which case he can either take another personality, as Homer does, or speak in his own person, unchanged—or he may present all his characters as living and moving before us."

Though they conceive of mimesis in quite different ways, its relation with diegesis is identical in Plato's and Aristotle's formulations.

In ludology, mimesis is sometimes used to refer to the self-consistency of a represented world, and the availability of in-game rationalisations for elements of the gameplay. In this context, mimesis has an associated grade: highly self-consistent worlds that provide explanations for their puzzles and game mechanics are said to display a higher degree of mimesis. This usage can be traced back to the essay "Crimes Against Mimesis".

Dionysian imitatio

Dionysian imitatio is the influential literary method of imitation as formulated by Greek author Dionysius of Halicarnassus in the 1st century BC, who conceived it as technique of rhetoric: emulating, adapting, reworking, and enriching a source text by an earlier author.

Dionysius' concept marked a significant departure from the concept of mimesis formulated by Aristotle in the 4th century BC, which was only concerned with "imitation of nature" rather than the "imitation of other authors." Latin orators and rhetoricians adopted the literary method of Dionysius' imitatio and discarded Aristotle's mimesis.

Modern usage

Samuel Taylor Coleridge
Referring to it as imitation, the concept of mimesis was crucial for Samuel Taylor Coleridge's theory of the imagination. Coleridge begins his thoughts on imitation and poetry from Plato, Aristotle, and Philip Sidney, adopting their concept of imitation of nature instead of other writers. His departure from the earlier thinkers lies in his arguing that art does not reveal a unity of essence through its ability to achieve sameness with nature. Coleridge claims:

Here, Coleridge opposes imitation to copying, the latter referring to William Wordsworth's notion that poetry should duplicate nature by capturing actual speech. Coleridge instead argues that the unity of essence is revealed precisely through different materialities and media. Imitation, therefore, reveals the sameness of processes in nature.

Erich Auerbach 
One of the best-known modern studies of mimesis—understood in literature as a form of realism—is Erich Auerbach's Mimesis: The Representation of Reality in Western Literature, which opens with a famous comparison between the way the world is represented in Homer's Odyssey and the way it appears in the Bible. From these two seminal texts—the former being Western and the latter having been written by various Middle Eastern writers—Auerbach builds the foundation for a unified theory of representation that spans the entire history of Western literature, including the Modernist novels being written at the time Auerbach began his study.

Walter Benjamin 
In his essay, "On The Mimetic Faculty"(1933) Walter Benjamin outlines connections between mimesis and sympathetic magic, imagining a possible origin of astrology arising from an interpretation of human birth that assumes its correspondence with the apparition of a seasonally rising constellation augurs that new life will take on aspects of the myth connected to the star.

Luce Irigaray
Belgian feminist Luce Irigaray used the term to describe a form of resistance where women imperfectly imitate stereotypes about themselves to expose and undermine such stereotypes.

Michael Taussig

In Mimesis and Alterity (1993), anthropologist Michael Taussig examines the way that people from one culture adopt another's nature and culture (the process of mimesis) at the same time as distancing themselves from it (the process of alterity). He describes how a legendary tribe, the "White Indians" (the Guna people of Panama and Colombia), have adopted in various representations figures and images reminiscent of the white people they encountered in the past (without acknowledging doing so).

Taussig, however, criticises anthropology for reducing yet another culture, that of the Guna, for having been so impressed by the exotic technologies of the whites that they raised them to the status of gods. To Taussig this reductionism is suspect, and he argues this from both sides in his Mimesis and Alterity to see values in the anthropologists' perspective while simultaneously defending the independence of a lived culture from the perspective of anthropological reductionism.

René Girard
In Things Hidden Since the Foundation of the World (1978), René Girard posits that human behavior is based upon mimesis, and that imitation can engender pointless conflict. Girard notes the productive potential of competition: "It is because of this unprecedented capacity to promote competition within limits that always remain socially, if not individually, acceptable that we have all the amazing achievements of the modern world," but states that competition stifles progress once it becomes an end in itself: "rivals are more apt to forget about whatever objects are the cause of the rivalry and instead become more fascinated with one another."

Roberto Calasso 
In The Unnameable Present, Calasso outlines the way that mimesis, called "Mimickry" by Joseph Goebbels—though it is a universal human ability—was interpreted by the Third Reich as being a sort of original sin attributable to "the Jew." Thus, an objection to the tendency of human beings to mimic one another instead of "just being themselves" and a complementary,  fantasized desire to achieve a return to an eternally static pattern of predation by means of "will" expressed as systematic mass-murder became the metaphysical argument (underlying circumstantial, temporally contingent arguments deployed opportunistically for propaganda purposes) for perpetrating the Holocaust amongst the Nazi elite. Insofar as this issue or this purpose was ever even explicitly discussed in print by Hitler's inner-circle, in other words, this was the justification (appearing in the essay "Mimickry" in a war-time book published by Joseph Goebbels). The text suggests that a radical failure to understand the nature of mimesis as an innate human trait or a violent aversion to the same, tends to be a diagnostic symptom of the totalitarian or fascist character if it is not, in fact, the original unspoken occult impulse that animated the production of totalitarian or fascist movements to begin with.

Calasso's argument here echoes, condenses and introduces new evidence to reinforce one of the major themes of Adorno and Horkheimer's Dialectic of the Enlightenment (1944), which was itself in dialog with earlier work hinting in this direction by Walter Benjamin who died during an attempt to escape the gestapo. Calasso insinuates and references this lineage throughout the text.  The work can be read as a clarification of their earlier gestures in this direction, written while the Holocaust was still unfolding.

Calasso's earlier book The Celestial Hunter, written immediately prior to The Unnamable Present, is an informed and scholarly speculative cosmology depicting the possible origins and early prehistoric cultural evolution of the human mimetic faculty. In particular, the books first and fifth chapters ("In The Time of the Great Raven" and "Sages & Predators") focuses on the terrain of mimesis and its early origins, though insights in this territory appear as a motif in every chapter of the book.

Nidesh Lawtoo 
In Homo Mimeticus (2022) Swiss philosopher and critic Nidesh Lawtoo develops a relational theory of mimetic subjectivity arguing that not only desires but all affects are mimetic, for good and ill. Lawtoo opens up the transdisciplinary field of "mimetic studies" to account for the proliferation of hypermimetic affects in the digital age.

See also
Similarity (philosophy)
Man, Play and Games (Roger Caillois)

References

Classical sources

Citations

Bibliography
 Auerbach, Erich . 1953. Mimesis: The Representation of Reality in Western Literature . Princeton: Princeton UP. .
 Coleridge, Samuel T. 1983. Biographia Literaria, vol. 1, edited by J. Engell and W. J. Bate. Princeton, NJ: Princeton UP. .
 Davis, Michael. 1999. The Poetry of Philosophy: On Aristotle's Poetics . South Bend, IN: St Augustine's P. .
 Elam, Keir. 1980. The Semiotics of Theatre and Drama , New Accents series. London: Methuen. .
 Gebauer, Gunter, and Christoph Wulf. [1992] 1995. Mimesis: Culture—Art—Society , translated by D. Reneau. Berkeley, CA: U of California Press. .
Girard, René. 2008. Mimesis and Theory: Essays on Literature and Criticism, 1953–2005, edited by R. Doran. Stanford: Stanford University Press. . 
 Halliwell, Stephen. 2002. The Aesthetics of Mimesis. Ancient Texts and Modern Problems . Princeton. .
 Kaufmann, Walter . 1992. Tragedy and Philosophy . Princeton: Princeton UP. .
 Lacoue-Labarthe, Philippe. 1989. Typography: Mimesis, Philosophy, Politics, edited by C. Fynsk. Cambridge: Harvard UP. .
 Lawtoo, Nidesh. 2013. The Phantom of the Ego: Modernism and the Mimetic Unconscious. East Lansing: Michigan State UP. . 
 Lawtoo, Nidesh. 2022. Homo Mimeticus: A New Theory of Imitation Leuven: Leuven UP. .
Miller, Gregg Daniel. 2011. Mimesis and Reason: Habermas's Political Philosophy. Albany, NY: SUNY Press. 
 Pfister, Manfred. [1977] 1988. The Theory and Analysis of Drama , translated by J. Halliday, European Studies in English Literature series. Cambridige: Cambridge UP. .
 Potolsky, Matthew. 2006. Mimesis. London: Routledge. . 
 Prang, Christoph. 2010. "Semiomimesis: The influence of semiotics on the creation of literary texts. Peter Bichsel's Ein Tisch ist ein Tisch and Joseph Roth's Hotel Savoy." Semiotica (182):375–96.
Sen, R. K. 1966. Aesthetic Enjoyment: Its Background in Philosophy and Medicine. Calcutta: University of Calcutta.
—— 2001. Mimesis. Calcutta: Syamaprasad College.
 Sörbom, Göran. 1966. Mimesis and Art . Uppsala.
 Snow, Kim, Hugh Crethar, Patricia Robey, and John Carlson. 2005. "Theories of Family Therapy (Part 1)." As cited in "Family Therapy Review: Preparing for Comprehensive Licensing Examination." 2005. Lawrence Erlbaum Associates. .
 Tatarkiewicz, Władysław . 1980. A History of Six Ideas: An Essay in Aesthetics , translated by C. Kasparek . The Hague: Martinus Nijhoff. .
 Taussig, Michael . 1993. Mimesis and Alterity: A Particular History of the Senses . London: Routledge. .
 Tsitsiridis, Stavros. 2005. "Mimesis and Understanding. An Interpretation of Aristotle's 'Poetics' 4.1448b4-19." Classical Quarterly (55):435–46.

External links

 Plato's Republic II, transl. Benjamin Jowett
 Plato's Republic III, transl. Benjamin Jowett
 Plato's Republic X, transl. Benjamin Jowett
 The Infinite Regress of Forms Plato's recounting of the "bedness" theory involved in the bed metaphor
 The University of Chicago, Theories of Media Keywords
 University of Barcelona Mimesi (Research on Poetics & Rhetorics in Catalan Literature)
 Mimesislab, Laboratory of Pedagogy of Expression of the Department of Educational Design of the university "Roma Tre"
 "Mimesis", an article by Władysław Tatarkiewicz for the Dictionary of History of Ideas
 "Mimesis", 2021, an article by María Antonia González Valerio for the Online Encyclopedia Philosophy of Nature, doi: https://doi.org/10.11588/oepn.2019.0.79538.

Ancient Greek theatre
Aristotelianism
The arts
Concepts in aesthetics
Concepts in ancient Greek aesthetics
Concepts in ancient Greek epistemology
Concepts in ancient Greek philosophy of mind
Concepts in epistemology
Concepts in the philosophy of mind
Drama
Film theory
Greek Muses
Literary concepts
Narratology
Philosophy of mind
Platonism
Play (activity)
Plot (narrative)
Poetics
Theatre
Theories in ancient Greek philosophy
Visual arts
Visual arts theory